The Museum of Photography, Seoul is a photography museum in Bangi-dong, Songpa-gu, Seoul, South Korea.

See also
List of museums in South Korea

External links

Art museums and galleries in Seoul
Buildings and structures in Songpa District
Photography museums and galleries in South Korea